A vowel is a syllabic speech sound pronounced without any stricture in the vocal tract. Vowels are one of the two principal classes of speech sounds, the other being the consonant. Vowels vary in quality, in loudness and also in quantity (length). They are usually voiced and are closely involved in prosodic variation such as tone, intonation and stress.

The word vowel comes from the Latin word , meaning "vocal" (i.e. relating to the voice). In English, the word vowel is commonly used to refer both to vowel sounds and to the written symbols that represent them (a, e, i, o, u, and sometimes w and y).

Definition
There are two complementary definitions of vowel, one phonetic and the other phonological.
In the phonetic definition, a vowel is a sound, such as the English "ah"  or "oh" , produced with an open vocal tract; it is median (the air escapes along the middle of the tongue), oral (at least some of the airflow must escape through the mouth), frictionless and continuant. There is no significant build-up of air pressure at any point above the glottis. This contrasts with consonants, such as the English "sh" , which have a constriction or closure at some point along the vocal tract. 
In the phonological definition, a vowel is defined as syllabic, the sound that forms the peak of a syllable. A phonetically equivalent but non-syllabic sound is a semivowel. In oral languages, phonetic vowels normally form the peak (nucleus) of many or all syllables, whereas consonants form the onset and (in languages that have them) coda. Some languages allow other sounds to form the nucleus of a syllable, such as the syllabic (i.e., vocalic) l in the English word table  (when not considered to have a weak vowel sound) or the syllabic r in the Serbo-Croatian word vrt  "garden".

The phonetic definition of "vowel" (i.e. a sound produced with no constriction in the vocal tract) does not always match the phonological definition (i.e. a sound that forms the peak of a syllable). The approximants  and  illustrate this: both are  without much of a constriction in the vocal tract (so phonetically they seem to be vowel-like), but they occur at the onset of syllables (e.g. in "yet" and "wet") which suggests that phonologically they are consonants. A similar debate arises over whether a word like bird in a rhotic dialect has an r-colored vowel  or a syllabic consonant . However, Maddieson and Emmory (1985) demonstrated from a range of languages that semivowels are produced with a narrower constriction of the vocal tract than vowels, and so may be considered consonants on that basis. Nonetheless, the phonetic and phonemic definitions would still conflict for the syllabic /l/ in table or the syllabic nasals in button and rhythm.

Articulation 

The traditional view of vowel production, reflected for example in the terminology and presentation of the International Phonetic Alphabet, is one of articulatory features that determine a vowel's quality as distinguishing it from other vowels. Daniel Jones developed the cardinal vowel system to describe vowels in terms of the features of tongue height (vertical dimension), tongue backness (horizontal dimension) and roundedness (lip articulation). These three parameters are indicated in the schematic quadrilateral IPA vowel diagram on the right. There are additional features of vowel quality, such as the velum position (nasality), type of vocal fold vibration (phonation), and tongue root position.

This conception of vowel articulation has been known to be inaccurate since 1928. Peter Ladefoged has said that "early phoneticians... thought they were describing the highest point of the tongue, but they were not. They were actually describing formant frequencies." (See below.) The IPA Handbook concedes that "the vowel quadrilateral must be regarded as an abstraction and not a direct mapping of tongue position."

Nonetheless, the concept that vowel qualities are determined primarily by tongue position and lip rounding continues to be used in pedagogy, as it provides an intuitive explanation of how vowels are distinguished.

Height
Theoretically, vowel height refers to the vertical position of either the tongue or the jaw (depending on the model) relative to either the roof of the mouth or the aperture of the jaw. In practice, however, it refers to the first formant (lowest resonance of the voice), abbreviated F1, which is associated with the height of the tongue. Height is defined by the inverse of the F1 value: the higher the frequency of the first formant, the lower (more open) the vowel. In John Elsing's usage, where fronted vowels are distinguished in height by the position of the jaw rather than the tongue, only the terms 'open' and 'close' are used, as 'high' and 'low' refer to the position of the tongue.

The International Phonetic Alphabet defines seven degrees of vowel height, but no language is known to distinguish all of them without distinguishing another attribute:

 close (high)
 near-close (near-high)
 close-mid (high-mid)
 mid (true-mid)
 open-mid (low-mid)
 near-open (near-low)
 open (low)

The letters  are typically used for either close-mid or true-mid vowels. However, if more precision is required, true-mid vowels may be written with a lowering diacritic . The Kensiu language, spoken in Malaysia and Thailand, is highly unusual in that it contrasts true-mid with close-mid and open-mid vowels, without any difference in other parameters like backness or roundness.

It appears that some varieties of German have five vowel heights that contrast independently of length or other parameters. The Bavarian dialect of Amstetten has thirteen long vowels, which can be analyzed as distinguishing five heights (close, close-mid, mid, open-mid and open) each among the front unrounded, front rounded, and back rounded vowels as well as an open central vowel, for a total of five vowel heights: . No other language is known to contrast more than four degrees of vowel height.

The parameter of vowel height appears to be the primary cross-linguistic feature of vowels in that all spoken languages that have been researched till now use height as a contrastive feature. No other parameter, even backness or rounding (see below), is used in all languages. Some languages have vertical vowel systems in which at least at a phonemic level, only height is used to distinguish vowels.

Backness 

Vowel backness is named for the position of the tongue during the articulation of a vowel relative to the back of the mouth. As with vowel height, however, it is defined by a formant of the voice, in this case the second, F2, not by the position of the tongue.

The International Phonetic Alphabet defines five degrees of vowel backness:
 front
 near-front
 central
 near-back
 back

To them may be added front-central and back-central, corresponding to the vertical lines separating central from front and back vowel spaces in several IPA diagrams. However, front-central and back-central may also be used as terms synonymous with near-front and near-back. No language is known to contrast more than three degrees of backness nor is there a language that contrasts front with near-front vowels nor back with near-back ones.

Although some English dialects have vowels at five degrees of backness, there is no known language that distinguishes five degrees of backness without additional differences in height or rounding.

Roundedness 

Roundedness is named after the rounding of the lips in some vowels. Because lip rounding is easily visible, vowels may be commonly identified as rounded based on the articulation of the lips. Acoustically, rounded vowels are identified chiefly by a decrease in F2, although F1 is also slightly decreased.

In most languages, roundedness is a reinforcing feature of mid to high back vowels rather than a distinctive feature. Usually, the higher a back vowel, the more intense is the rounding.

Nonetheless, even in those languages there is usually some phonetic correlation between rounding and backness: front rounded vowels tend to be more front-central than front, and back unrounded vowels tend to be more back-central than back. Thus, the placement of unrounded vowels to the left of rounded vowels on the IPA vowel chart is reflective of their position in formant space.

Different kinds of labialization are possible. In mid to high rounded back vowels the lips are generally protruded ("pursed") outward, a phenomenon known as endolabial rounding because the insides of the lips are visible, whereas in mid to high rounded front vowels the lips are generally "compressed" with the margins of the lips pulled in and drawn towards each other, a phenomenon known as exolabial rounding. However, not all languages follow that pattern. Japanese , for example, is an exolabial (compressed) back vowel, and sounds quite different from an English endolabial . Swedish and Norwegian are the only two known languages in which the feature is contrastive; they have both exo- and endo-labial close front vowels and close central vowels, respectively. In many phonetic treatments, both are considered types of rounding, but some phoneticians do not believe that these are subsets of a single phenomenon and posit instead three independent features of rounded (endolabial), compressed (exolabial), and unrounded. The lip position of unrounded vowels may also be classified separately as spread and neutral (neither rounded nor spread). Others distinguish compressed rounded vowels, in which the corners of the mouth are drawn together, from compressed unrounded vowels, in which the lips are compressed but the corners remain apart as in spread vowels.

Front, raised and retracted

The conception of the tongue moving in two directions, high–low and front–back, is not supported by articulatory evidence and does not clarify how articulation affects vowel quality. Vowels may instead be characterized by the three directions of movement of the tongue from its neutral position: front (forward), raised (upward and back), and retracted (downward and back). Front vowels ( and, to a lesser extent , etc.), can be secondarily qualified as close or open, as in the traditional conception, but this refers to jaw rather than tongue position. In addition, rather than there being a unitary category of back vowels, the regrouping posits raised vowels, where the body of the tongue approaches the velum (], etc.), and retracted vowels, where the root of the tongue approaches the pharynx (etc.):
 front
 raised
 retracted

Membership in these categories is scalar, with the mid-central vowels being marginal to any category.

Nasalization 

Nasalization occurs when air escapes through the nose. Vowels are often nasalised under the influence of neighbouring nasal consonants, as in English hand . Nasalised vowels, however, should not be confused with nasal vowels. The latter refers to vowels that are distinct from their oral counterparts, as in French  vs. .

In nasal vowels, the velum is lowered, and some air travels through the nasal cavity as well as the mouth. An oral vowel is a vowel in which all air escapes through the mouth. Polish and Portuguese also contrast nasal and oral vowels.

Phonation 

Voicing describes whether the vocal cords are vibrating during the articulation of a vowel. Most languages have only voiced vowels, but several Native American languages, such as Cheyenne and Totonac, contrast voiced and devoiced vowels. Vowels are devoiced in whispered speech. In Japanese and in Quebec French, vowels that are between voiceless consonants are often devoiced.

Modal voice, creaky voice, and breathy voice (murmured vowels) are phonation types that are used contrastively in some languages. Often, they co-occur with tone or stress distinctions; in the Mon language, vowels pronounced in the high tone are also produced with creaky voice. In such cases, it can be unclear whether it is the tone, the voicing type, or the pairing of the two that is being used for phonemic contrast. The combination of phonetic cues (phonation, tone, stress) is known as register or register complex.

Tenseness 

Tenseness is used to describe the opposition of tense vowels vs. lax vowels. This opposition has traditionally been thought to be a result of greater muscular tension, though phonetic experiments have repeatedly failed to show this.

Unlike the other features of vowel quality, tenseness is only applicable to the few languages that have this opposition (mainly Germanic languages, e.g. English), whereas the vowels of the other languages (e.g. Spanish) cannot be described with respect to tenseness in any meaningful way.

One may distinguish the English tense vs. lax vowels roughly, with its spelling. Tense vowels usually occur in words with the final silent e, as in mate. Lax vowels occur in words without the silent e, such as mat. In American English, lax vowels  do not appear in stressed open syllables.

In traditional grammar, long vowels vs. short vowels are more commonly used, compared to tense and lax. The two sets of terms are used interchangeably by some because the features are concomitant in some varieties of English. In most Germanic languages, lax vowels can only occur in closed syllables. Therefore, they are also known as checked vowels, whereas the tense vowels are called free vowels since they can occur in any kind of syllable.

Tongue root position 

Advanced tongue root (ATR) is a feature common across much of Africa, the Pacific Northwest, and scattered other languages such as Modern Mongolian. The contrast between advanced and retracted tongue root resembles the tense-lax contrast acoustically, but they are articulated differently. Those vowels involve noticeable tension in the vocal tract.

Secondary narrowings in the vocal tract 

Pharyngealized vowels occur in some languages like Sedang and the Tungusic languages. Pharyngealisation is similar in articulation to retracted tongue root but is acoustically distinct.

A stronger degree of pharyngealisation occurs in the Northeast Caucasian languages and the Khoisan languages. They might be called epiglottalized since the primary constriction is at the tip of the epiglottis.

The greatest degree of pharyngealisation is found in the strident vowels of the Khoisan languages, where the larynx is raised, and the pharynx constricted, so that either the epiglottis or the arytenoid cartilages vibrate instead of the vocal cords.

Note that the terms pharyngealized, epiglottalized, strident, and sphincteric are sometimes used interchangeably.

Rhotic vowels 

Rhotic vowels are the "R-colored vowels" of American English and a few other languages.

Reduced vowels 

Some languages, such as English and Russian, have what are called 'reduced', 'weak' or 'obscure' vowels in some unstressed positions. These do not correspond one-to-one with the vowel sounds that occur in stressed position (so-called 'full' vowels), and they tend to be mid-centralized in comparison, as well as having reduced rounding or spreading. The IPA has long provided two letters for obscure vowels, mid  and lower , neither of which are defined for rounding.

Acoustics 

The acoustics of vowels are fairly well understood. The different vowel qualities are realized in acoustic analyses of vowels by the relative values of the formants, acoustic resonances of the vocal tract which show up as dark bands on a spectrogram. The vocal tract acts as a resonant cavity, and the position of the jaw, lips, and tongue affect the parameters of the resonant cavity, resulting in different formant values. The acoustics of vowels can be visualized using spectrograms, which display the acoustic energy at each frequency, and how this changes with time.

The first formant, abbreviated "F1", corresponds to vowel openness (vowel height). Open vowels have high F1 frequencies, while close vowels have low F1 frequencies, as can be seen in the accompanying spectrogram: The  and  have similar low first formants, whereas  has a higher formant.

The second formant, F2, corresponds to vowel frontness. Back vowels have low F2 frequencies, while front vowels have high F2 frequencies. This is very clear in the spectrogram, where the front vowel  has a much higher F2 frequency than the other two vowels. However, in open vowels, the high F1 frequency forces a rise in the F2 frequency as well, so an alternative measure of frontness is the difference between the first and second formants. For this reason, some people prefer to plot as F1 vs. F2 – F1. (This dimension is usually called 'backness' rather than 'frontness', but the term 'backness' can be counterintuitive when discussing formants.)

In the third edition of his textbook, Peter Ladefoged recommended using plots of F1 against F2 – F1 to represent vowel quality. However, in the fourth edition, he changed to adopt a simple plot of F1 against F2, and this simple plot of F1 against F2 was maintained for the fifth (and final) edition of the book. Katrina Hayward compares the two types of plots and concludes that plotting of F1 against F2 – F1 "is not very satisfactory because of its effect on the placing of the central vowels", so she also recommends use of a simple plot of F1 against F2. In fact, this kind of plot of F1 against F2 has been used by analysts to show the quality of the vowels in a wide range of languages, including RP, the Queen's English, American English, Singapore English, Brunei English, North Frisian, Turkish Kabardian, and various indigenous Australian languages.

R-colored vowels are characterized by lowered F3 values.

Rounding is generally realized by a decrease of F2 that tends to reinforce vowel backness. One effect of this is that back vowels are most commonly rounded while front vowels are most commonly unrounded; another is that rounded vowels tend to plot to the right of unrounded vowels in vowel charts. That is, there is a reason for plotting vowel pairs the way they are.

Prosody and intonation 

In addition to variation in vowel quality as described above, vowels vary as a result of differences in prosody. The most important prosodic variables are pitch (fundamental frequency), loudness (intensity) and length (duration). However, the features of prosody are usually considered to apply not to the vowel itself, but to the syllable in which the vowel occurs. In other words, the domain of prosody is the syllable, not the segment (vowel or consonant). We can list briefly the effect of prosody on the vowel component of a syllable.

 Pitch: in the case of a syllable such as 'cat', the only voiced portion of the syllable is the vowel, so the vowel carries the pitch information. This may relate to the syllable in which it occurs, or to a larger stretch of speech to which an intonation contour belongs. In a word such as 'man', all the segments in the syllable are sonorant and all will participate in any pitch variation.
 Loudness: this variable has been traditionally associated with linguistic stress, though other factors are usually involved in this. Lehiste (ibid) argues that stress, or loudness, could not be associated with a single segment in a syllable independently of the rest of the syllable (p. 147). This means that vowel loudness is a concomitant of the loudness of the syllable in which it occurs.
 Length: it is important to distinguish two aspects of vowel length. One is the phonological difference in length exhibited by some languages. Japanese, Finnish, Hungarian, Arabic and Latin have a two-way phonemic contrast between short and long vowels. The Mixe language has a three-way contrast among short, half-long, and long vowels. The other type of length variation in vowels is non-distinctive, and is the result of prosodic variation in speech: vowels tend to be lengthened when in a stressed syllable, or when utterance rate is slow.

Monophthongs, diphthongs, triphthongs 

A vowel sound whose quality does not change throughout the vowel is called a monophthong. Monophthongs are sometimes called "pure" or "stable" vowels. A vowel sound that glides from one quality to another is called a diphthong, and a vowel sound that glides successively through three qualities is a triphthong.

All languages have monophthongs and many languages have diphthongs, but triphthongs or vowel sounds with even more target qualities are relatively rare cross-linguistically. English has all three types: the vowel sound in hit is a monophthong , the vowel sound in boy is in most dialects a diphthong , and the vowel sounds of flower, form a triphthong or disyllable, depending on the dialect.

In phonology, diphthongs and triphthongs are distinguished from sequences of monophthongs by whether the vowel sound may be analyzed into distinct phonemes. For example, the vowel sounds in a two-syllable pronunciation of the word flower phonetically form a disyllabic triphthong but are phonologically a sequence of a diphthong (represented by the letters ) and a monophthong (represented by the letters ). Some linguists use the terms diphthong and triphthong only in this phonemic sense.

Written vowels 

The name "vowel" is often used for the symbols that represent vowel sounds in a language's writing system, particularly if the language uses an alphabet. In writing systems based on the Latin alphabet, the letters A, E, I, O, U, Y, W and sometimes others can all be used to represent vowels. However, not all of these letters represent the vowels in all languages that use this writing, or even consistently within one language. Some of them, especially W and Y, are also used to represent approximant consonants. Moreover, a vowel might be represented by a letter usually reserved for consonants, or a combination of letters, particularly where one letter represents several sounds at once, or vice versa; examples from English include igh in "thigh" and x in "x-ray". In addition, extensions of the Latin alphabet have such independent vowel letters as Ä, Ö, Ü, Å, Æ, and Ø.

The phonetic values vary considerably by language, and some languages use I and Y for the consonant , e.g., initial I in Italian or Romanian and initial Y in English. In Modern Welsh, the letter W represents these same sounds. There is not necessarily a direct one-to-one correspondence between the vowel sounds of a language and the vowel letters. Many languages that use a form of the Latin alphabet have more vowel sounds than can be represented by the standard set of five vowel letters. In English spelling, the five letters A E I O and U can represent a variety of vowel sounds, while the letter Y frequently represents vowels (as in e.g., "gym", "happy", or the diphthongs in "cry", "thyme"); W is used in representing some diphthongs (as in "cow") and to represent a monophthong in the borrowed words "" and "" (sometimes cruth).

Other languages cope with the limitation in the number of Latin vowel letters in similar ways. Many languages make extensive use of combinations of letters to represent various sounds. Other languages use vowel letters with modifications, such as ä in Swedish, or add diacritical marks, like umlauts, to vowels to represent the variety of possible vowel sounds. Some languages have also constructed additional vowel letters by modifying the standard Latin vowels in other ways, such as æ or ø that are found in some of the Scandinavian languages. The International Phonetic Alphabet has a set of 28 symbols representing the range of essential vowel qualities, and a further set of diacritics to denote variations from the basic vowel.

The writing systems used for some languages, such as the Hebrew alphabet and the Arabic alphabet, do not ordinarily mark all the vowels, since they are frequently unnecessary in identifying a word.  Technically, these are called abjads rather than alphabets. Although it is possible to construct  English sentences that can be understood without written vowels (cn y rd ths?), single words in English lacking written vowels can be indistinguishable; consider dd, which could be any of dad, dada, dado, dead, deed, did, died, diode, dodo, dud, dude, odd, add, and aided. (Note that abjads generally express some word-internal vowels and all word-initial and word-final vowels, whereby the ambiguity will be much reduced.) The Masoretes devised a vowel notation system for Hebrew Jewish scripture that is still widely used, as well as the trope symbols used for its cantillation; both are part of oral tradition and still the basis for many bible translations—Jewish and Christian.

Shifts
The differences in pronunciation of vowel letters between English and its related languages can be accounted for by the Great Vowel Shift. After printing was introduced to England, and therefore after spelling was more or less standardized, a series of dramatic changes in the pronunciation of the vowel phonemes occurred, and continued into recent centuries, but were not reflected in the spelling system. This has led to numerous inconsistencies in the spelling of English vowel sounds and the pronunciation of English vowel letters (and to the mispronunciation of foreign words and names by speakers of English).

Audio samples

Systems 
The importance of vowels in distinguishing one word from another varies from language to language.

It is not straightforward to say which language has the most vowels, since that depends on how they are counted. For example, long vowels, nasal vowels, and various phonations may or may not be counted separately; indeed, it may sometimes be unclear if phonation belongs to the vowels or the consonants of a language. If such things are ignored and only vowels with dedicated IPA letters ('vowel qualities') are considered, then very few languages have more than ten. The Germanic languages have some of the largest inventories: Standard Danish has 11 to 13 short vowels, while the Amstetten dialect of Bavarian has been reported to have thirteen long vowels: . The situation can be quite disparate within a same family language: Spanish and French are two closely related Romance languages but Spanish has only five pure vowel qualities, while classical French has eleven:  and four nasal vowels . The Mon–Khmer languages of Southeast Asia also have some large inventories, such as the eleven vowels of Vietnamese: . Wu dialects have the largest inventories of Chinese; the Jinhui dialect of Wu has also been reported to have eleven vowels: ten basic vowels, plus restricted ; this does not count the seven nasal vowels.

The third vowel of the Arabic-type three-vowel system, is considerably less common. A large fraction of the languages of North America happen to have a four-vowel system without : ; Nahuatl and Navajo are examples.

In most languages, vowels serve mainly to distinguish separate lexemes, rather than different inflectional forms of the same lexeme as they commonly do in the Semitic languages. For example, while English man becomes men in the plural, moon is a completely different word.

Words without vowels

In rhotic dialects of English, as in Canada and the United States, there are many words such as bird, learn, girl, church, worst, wyrm, myrrh that some phoneticians analyze as having no vowels, only a syllabic consonant . However, others analyze these words instead as having a rhotic vowel, . The difference may be partially one of dialect.

The word and frequently contracts to a simple nasal ’n, as in lock 'n key . Words such as will, have, and is regularly contract to ’ll , ’ve , and 's . However, none of them are pronounced alone without vowels, so they are not phonological words. Onomatopoeic words that can be pronounced alone, and that have no vowels or ars, include hmm, pst!, shh!, tsk!, and zzz. As in other languages, onomatopoeiae stand outside the normal phonotactics of English.

There are other languages that form lexical words without vowel sounds. In Czech and Slovak, either  or  can stand in for vowels:   "wolf",   "neck". (Here  has two syllables based on L; and note that the preposition  consists of a single consonant. Only prepositions do this in Czech, and they normally link phonetically to the following word, so not really behave as vowelless words.)

In Kazakh and certain other Turkic languages, words without vowel sounds may occur due to reduction of weak vowels. A common example is the Kazakh word for one: , pronounced . Among careful speakers, however, the original vowel may be preserved, and the vowels are always preserved in the orthography.

In Southern varieties of Chinese, such as Cantonese and Minnan, some monosyllabic words are made of exclusively nasals, such as Cantonese  "no" and  "five". Minnan also has words consisting of a consonant followed by a syllabic nasal, such as pn̄g "cooked rice".

(They can carry tone, for example.) However, there are languages with lexical words that not only contain no vowels, but contain no sonorants at all, like (non-lexical) shh! in English. These include some Berber languages and some languages of the American Pacific Northwest, such as Nuxalk. An example from the latter is  "seal fat" (pronounced , as spelled), and a longer one is clhp'xwlhtlhplhhskwts' (pronounced ) "he had had in his possession a bunchberry plant". (Follow the Nuxalk link for other examples.) Berber examples include  "you took it off" and  "you gave it". Some words may contain one or two consonants only:  "be",  "feed on". In the Japonic language Miyako, there are words with no voiced sounds, such as  'dust',  'breast/milk',  'day',  'a comb',  'to make',  'to build',  'month',  'to cut',  'to pull'.

Some analyses of Wandala is reported to have no phonemic vowels.

Words consisting of only vowels
It is not uncommon for short grammatical words to consist of only vowels, such as a and I in English. Lexical words are somewhat rarer in English and are generally restricted to a single syllable: eye, awe, owe, and in non-rhotic accents air, ore, err. Vowel-only words of more than one syllable are generally foreign loans, such as ai for the maned sloth, or proper names, such as Iowa.

However, vowel sequences in hiatus are more freely allowed in some other languages, most famously perhaps in Bantu and Polynesian languages, but also in Japanese and Finnic languages. In such languages there tends to be a larger variety of vowel-only words. In Swahili (Bantu), for example, there is aua 'to survey' and eua 'to purify' (both three syllables); in Japanese, aoi 青い 'blue/green' and oioi 追々 'gradually' (three and four morae); and in Finnish,  'intention' and  'open!' In Urdu, āye/aaie  or āyn  'come' is used. Most long words involve reduplication, which is quite productive in Polynesian:  'grooves',  'breath',  'tough' (all four syllables),  'crying' (five syllables, from  'to weep'),  or  'false mullet' (sp. fish, three or five syllables).

See also 
 English phonology
 Great Vowel Shift
 Inherent vowel
 List of phonetics topics
 Mater lectionis
 Scale of vowels
 Table of vowels
 Vowel coalescence
 Words without vowels
 Zero consonant

Notes

References

Bibliography 
 Handbook of the International Phonetic Association, 1999. Cambridge University 
 Johnson, Keith, Acoustic & Auditory Phonetics, second edition, 2003. Blackwell 
 Korhonen, Mikko. Koltansaamen opas, 1973. Castreanum 
 Ladefoged, Peter, A Course in Phonetics, fifth edition, 2006. Boston, MA: Thomson Wadsworth 
 Ladefoged, Peter, Elements of Acoustic Phonetics, 1995. University of Chicago 
 
 Ladefoged, Peter, Vowels and Consonants: An Introduction to the Sounds of Languages, 2000. Blackwell .
 
 Stevens, Kenneth N. (1998). Acoustic phonetics. Current studies in linguistics (No. 30). Cambridge, MA: MIT. .
 
 Watt, D. and Tillotson, J. (2001). A spectrographic analysis of vowel fronting in Bradford English. English World-Wide 22:2, 269–302. Available at https://web.archive.org/web/20120412023624/http://www.abdn.ac.uk/langling/resources/Watt-Tillotson2001.pdf

External links

IPA chart with MP3 sound files
IPA vowel chart with AIFF sound files
Vowel charts for several different languages and dialects measuring F1 and F2
Materials for measuring and plotting vowel formants 
Vowels and Consonants  Online examples from Ladefoged's Vowels and Consonants, referenced above.

 
Manner of articulation
Phonetics